Hackmud is a massively multiplayer online video game and/or MUD that simulates 1990s hacker subculture through text-based adventure. Players use social engineering, scripting, and cracks in a text-based terminal to influence and control other players in the simulation. Reviewers wrote that the game's "campy hacking" mimics that of films like WarGames (1983) and Jurassic Park (1993).

References

External links

2016 video games
Indie video games
Multiplayer and single-player video games
Linux games
MacOS games
Windows games
Massively multiplayer online games
Cooperative video games
Video games developed in the United States
Video games scored by Lena Raine
Hacker culture
Simulation video games
Hacking video games
Programming games